Venise Chan (born 30 May 1989) is a former tennis player from Hong Kong. Chan, who reached No. 1 in Hong Kong and No. 340 in WTA rankings, also played college tennis for the University of Washington.

Early life
Chan was born in Hong Kong. Chan is fluent in Cantonese, Mandarin, English, and some Japanese.

Tennis career
At age 12 years 318 days, Chan became the youngest female since Paulette Moreno in 1977 to contest a Ladies' Open singles final in Hong Kong when she reached the title decider at the 2002 Hong Kong National Tennis Championships. 

She made her debut for the Hong Kong Fed Cup team in 2006, and has a 16–6 record. She won her sixth career pro circuit title at the $10k Sharm El Sheikh in Egypt. In her career, she won six women's singles and two doubles titles on the ITF Women's Circuit. 

She is also the youngest player from Hong Kong (16 years and 5 months) to lift a women's singles title and the only one to do so on her pro circuit debut.

Chan represented Hong Kong at the World University Games (2011), Asian Games (2010), All China Games (2009 and 2013), Asian Championships (2007), and Fed Cup (2006-2007 and 2012-2013).

In 2005 and 2011, Chan was nominated for the Hong Kong Sports Stars Awards, an annual Sports Federation & Olympic Committee of Hong Kong, China annual event.

As a junior, she reached a career-high ranking of No. 24 in the world. She competed in all four Junior Grand Slam championships ‒ Australian Open, Roland Garros, Wimbledon, and US Open. She also captured the Hong Kong National Junior Tennis Championships in the under-12, under-14, under-16, and under-18 age groups.

ITF Circuit finals

Singles (6–3)

Doubles (2–0)

References

External links
 
 
 

1989 births
Alumni of the University of Cambridge
Asian Games competitors for Hong Kong
Hong Kong female tennis players
Living people
Tennis players at the 2006 Asian Games
Tennis players at the 2010 Asian Games
Tennis players at the 2014 Asian Games
University of Washington Foster School of Business alumni